Sasural Ke Rang Anokhay() is a Pakistani anthology series, promoted as a "collection of assorted family stories" which premiered on 11 April 2012 on Hum TV. It is produced by Angeline Malik and Momina Duraid. Each episode consists of different cast.

It was also selected by Indian TV channel Zindagi TV, airing from 5 April 2015  under the title, Yeh Sasuraal Bemisaal.

Premise
The series is based on the stories of love, quarrels between the family members with in a family. This show displayed the relationship between family members. Each episode contains different characters with different story, presented in fascinating manner. Each episodes bring the mirror issues of a household and light, their tears and smiles are shared with the audience.

Cast

Rehan Sheikh
Eshita Mehboob Syed
Faisal Rehman
Seemi Raheel
Ahsan Khan
Maira Khan
Asma Abbas
Javed Sheikh
Momal Sheikh
Babar Khan
Behroze Sabzwari
Lubna Aslam
Sajal Ali
Angeline Malik
Samina Peerzada
Shagufta Ejaz
Shamoon Abbasi
Mawra Hocane
Soniya Hussain
Hassan Niazi
Maria Wasti
Madiha Rizvi as Maria
Seemi Pasha
Savera Nadeem
Ismat Zaidi
Humayun Ashraf
Qaiser Naqvi as Shaista
Diya Mughal
Yasir Shoro
Faizan Khawaja
Hiba Ali
Nausheen Shah
Munawar Saeed
Gul-e-Rana
Zhalay Sarhadi
Azfar Rehman
Danish Taimoor
Ayeza Khan

Soundtrack

References

External links 
 http://www.tv.com.pk/tvshow/Susaral-Ke-Rung-Anokhe/127/story
 http://www.zindagitv.in/shows/yeh-sasural-bemisal

Hum TV original programming
Pakistani television films
2012 Pakistani television series debuts
2013 Pakistani television series endings
Urdu-language telenovelas
Zee Zindagi original programming
Pakistani anthology television series